Thomas Horsley (1462–ca.1545) was a Northumberland corn merchant and merchant adventurer, who by the start of 16th century was a prominent citizen of Newcastle upon Tyne in North East England. As well as becoming a local magistrate, he was Sheriff of Newcastle in 1512 and its Lord Mayor in 1514, 1519, 1524–5 (for consecutive years) and 1533. In various official capacities, Horsley played an active role in defending the town's mercantile interests, and in 1522, during the Anglo-Scottish Wars, also served as a captain in forces of the English crown under the command of Lord Conyers. He is remembered today primarily as the founder of Newcastle's Royal Grammar School.

See also 

 List of mayors of Newcastle-upon-Tyne

Notes

References

16th-century English military personnel
Mayors of Newcastle upon Tyne
Year of birth unknown
Year of death missing
1462 births